Helen Houghton may refer to:

 Helen Houghton (comics), author and creator of Bugs Bunny comics
 Helen Houghton (politician), New Zealand politician and co-leader of the New Conservative Party
 Helen Johnson Houghton (née Walwyn; 1910–2012), British racehorse trainer